The 483rd Tactical Airlift Wing was a tactical airlift and composite wing assigned to Pacific Air Forces during the Vietnam War. It was the host organization at Cam Ranh Bay Air Base South Vietnam from 1970–1972.

The unit history includes the temporarily bestowed history of the World War II 483rd Bombardment Group, which was a United States Army Air Forces combat group. It served primarily in the Mediterranean, African, and The Middle East Theatres of World War II.  During the Korean War, the group was redesignated the 483rd Troop Carrier Group and assigned to the wing.

The Wing was first organized as the 483rd Troop Carrier Wing during the Korean War, as an airlift organization assigned to Far East Air Forces (later Pacific Air Forces) (PACAF) for duty.

History

Korean War 
 
The wing was activated at Ashiya AB, Japan as the 483rd Troop Carrier Wing on 1 January 1953 and replaced the 403rd Troop Carrier Wing, Medium and absorbed the 403rd's mission, personnel and equipment.  It was assigned to the 315th Air Division of Far East Air Forces (FEAF) for duty in the Korean War.

The wing was equipped with Fairchild C-119 Flying Boxcars and performed troop carrier and air transport operations in the Far East, including landing of troops and cargo in forward areas of the combat zone, air transportation of airborne troops and equipment, and air evacuation of casualties.  In June 1953, as the Korean war neared an armistice, all wing C-119s airlifted the entire 187th Regimental Combat Team (Airborne) from Kyushu, Japan to Seoul and Chunch'on, South Korea, to preclude enemy breakthroughs. This was the largest mass movement of personnel in the history of combat cargo to that time.  For is actions in the Korean War, the wing received the Korean Presidential Unit Citation.

Between April 1953 and September 1954, the wing aided the French Air Force in Indochina by training aircrews, evacuating wounded, and maintaining aircraft.  For these actions, the wing became one of the first units in the Air Force to receive the Air Force Outstanding Unit Award.  In 1958, the wing began to reequip with Lockheed C-130 Hercules aircraft.  Its transition was complete by 1959.  It performed theater transport duties and participated in joint exercises with Army units until inactivated in Japan on 23 June 1960.  Its squadrons were transferred to the direct control of the 315th Air Division and relocated to Naha Air Base and Tachikawa Air Base, Japan as Ashiya AB closed.

Vietnam War 
The 483rd Troop Carrier Wing (TCW) was again organized on 1 January 1967 at Cam Ranh Air Base, South Vietnam when the United States Army transferred all its C-7 Caribou aircraft to the Air Force.  The 483rd TCW was assigned the mission of providing intra-theater airlift in support of United States military civic actions, combat support and civic assistance throughout the Republic of Vietnam. In addition, the wing was transferred ex-United States Army C-7A Caribou light transports.

The C-7s provided the light load-short haul transport to rough landing strips in South Vietnam.  The unique capabilities of the C-7 for short landing and takeoff made Caribou transports vital to the war effort. On many occasions the C-7A's flew emergency airlift missions to airstrips and combat areas that no other aircraft could reach. Most notable were those in support of special forces camps in the Central Highlands.

In June 1968 the wing flew a record 2,420 combat troops in three days between Dak Pek, Ben Het and Đắk Tô. In August 1968 pinpoint night airdrops were accomplished at Duc Lap, Ha Thanh and Tonle Cham Special Forces camps. Ammunition and medical supplies were parachuted into 75-foot-square drop zones while the camps were under attack.  In June 1969 during the siege of Ben Het more than 200 tons of ammunition, POL, rations, water and medical supplies were airdropped into a 100 x 200-foot zone with every load on target and 100 per cent recovered.

In March 1969, a provisional group was established at Vung Tau Airfield to exercise command and control over the wing's units located there.  As drawdowns from Viet Nam began, the group was discontinued in June 1970.

In March 1970, when the 12th Tactical Fighter Wing was inactivated, the wing became the host wing at Cam Ranh Air Base. As a corrolary to assuming the support mission for the base, support organizations assigned to the wing carried out a number of civic actions, including construction of housing, providing support for orphanages and educational institutions and improvement of water supply systems.

Again in April 1970, the wing, now designated the 483rd Tactical Airlift Wing (TAW) helped break the siege of Dak Seang Special Forces Camp.  The wing flew 100 air-drop sorties under heavy hostile fire in ten days delivering some 400,000 pounds of vital supplies. When three C-7s were shot down with the loss of all crewmen between 2 and 6 April, the operation switched to low-level night drops. On 15 May 1970 the 459th Tactical Airlift Squadron (TAS) ceased operations in preparation for inactivation 1 June as part of the U.S. forces drawdown in Vietnam, and on 31 August 1971 its sister unit at Phù Cát Air Base, the 537th TAS, inactivated in place, followed shortly thereafter by the 536th TAS at Vung Tau.  During their five years' flying for the 483rd TAW, the C-7A Caribous carried more than 4.7 million passengers, averaging more than one million a year during 1967–1969. At the same time the wing averaged more than 100,000 tons of cargo each year.

On 31 August 1971, three electronic warfare squadrons from the inactivating 460th Tactical Reconnaissance Wing, stationed at various bases in Viet Nam, were assigned to the 483rd TAW. The following day, two special operations squadrons were transferred from the inactivating 14th Special Operations Wing. The electronic warfare squadrons were inactivated or assigned to other wings within six months.

The three remaining C-7 squadrons inactivated in early 1972 (535th TAS on 24 January, 458th on 1 March, and 457th on 30 April). Most of the C-7 Caribous were transferred to the VNAF. No. 35 Squadron RAAF at Vung Tau flew its last mission on 13 February 1972 and departed South Vietnam for RAAF Base Richmond in Australia on 19 February 1972; it was the last RAAF unit to leave following the decision to withdraw. The mixture of reassigned squadrons from other wings were all inactivated or reassigned by the end of May.  The 483rd Tactical Airlift Wing was inactivated on 31 May 1972. For its service in Vietnam, the 483rd TAW was awarded two Presidential Unit Citations, three Air Force Outstanding Unit Awards with combat "V" (Valor) device and three Republic of Viet Nam Gallantry Crosses.

Lineage
483rd Tactical Airlift Wing
 Constituted as 483rd Troop Carrier Wing, Medium, on 15 November 1952
 Activated on 1 January 1953,
 Discontinued and inactivated, on 25 June 1960
 Redesignated 483rd Troop Carrier Wing on 12 October 1966 and activated (not organized)
 Organized on 15 October 1966
 Redesignated 483rd Tactical Airlift Wing on 1 August 1967
 Inactivated on 31 May 1972.

Assignments
 Tactical Air Command (Attached to 315th Air Division (Combat Cargo)), 1 January 1953 – 30 June 1954
 315th Air Division (Combat Cargo), 1 July 1954 – 25 June 1960
 Pacific Air Forces, 12 October 1966 (not organized)
 834th Air Division, 15 October 1966 (Not operational, 15 October 1966 – 3 November 1966)
 Seventh Air Force, 1 December 1971 – 31 May 1972

Components

Groups
 314th Troop Carrier Group, 1 January 1953 – 15 November 1954 (Attached)
 316th Troop Carrier Group, 15 November 1954 – 18 June 1957 (Attached—Not operational after 15 March 1956)
 483rd Troop Carrier Group, 1 January 1953 – 8 December 1958 (Not operational after 15 March 1956)
 483rd Air Base Group (later 483rd Combat Support Group), 1 January 1953 – 25 June 1960, 31 March 1970 – 31 May 1972
 483rd Maintenance & Supply Group, 1 January 1953 – 8 December 1958 (Not operational after 15 March 1956)
 483rd Medical Group (later 483rd Tactical Hospital, 483rd USAF Hospital), 1 January 1953 – 25 June 1960, 31 March 1970 – 31 May 1972
 Tactical Group, Provisional, 6483rd, 15 March 1969 – 30 June 1970
 Located at Vung Tau Airfield, Viet Nam

Operational Squadrons
Korean War
 21st Troop Carrier Squadron: attached 1 July 1957 – 7 December 1958, assigned 8 December 1958 – 25 June 1960
 36th Troop Carrier Squadron: attached 15 March 1956 – 18 June 1957
 37th Troop Carrier Squadron: attached 15 March 1956 – 18 June 1957
 75th Troop Carrier Squadron: attached 15 March 1956 – 18 June 1957
 773rd Troop Carrier Squadron: attached ca, 30 August 1958 – 10 December 1958.
 815th Troop Carrier Squadron: attached 15 March 1956 – 8 December 1958, assigned 8 Dec 1958-25 Jun 1960
 816th Troop Carrier Squadron: attached 15 March 1956 – 8 December 1958, assigned 8 Dec 1958-25 Jun 1960
 817th Troop Carrier Squadron: attached 15 March 1956 – 8 December 1958, assigned 8 Dec 1958-25 Jun 1960
 6461st Troop Carrier Squadron (later Air Transport Squadron): 1 January 1953 – 24 June 1955 (Attached)

Vietnam War
 20th Special Operations Squadron: 1 September 1971 – 1 April 1972 (UH-1)
 90th Special Operations Squadron: 1 September 1971 – 15 April 1972 (A-37B Tail Code: CG)
 Stationed at Nha Trang Air Base, Viet Nam
 360th Tactical Electronic Warfare Squadron: 31 August 1971 – 1 February 1972 (EC-47N/P/Q Tail Code: AJ)
 Stationed at Tan Son Nhut Airport, Viet Nam
 361st Tactical Electronic Warfare Squadron: 31 August 1971 – 1 December 1971 (EC-47N/P/Q Tail Code: AL)
 Stationed at Phu Cat Air Base, Viet Nam
 362rd Tactical Electronic Warfare Squadron: 31 August 1971 – 1 February 1972 (EC-47N/P/Q C-47H Tail Code: AN)
 Stationed at Pleiku Air Base, Viet Nam
 457th Troop Carrier Squadron (later 457th Tactical Airlift) Squadron): 1 January 1967 – 30 April 1972 (C-7A Tail Code: KA; call sign Cuddy)
 458th Troop Carrier Squadron (later 458th Tactical Airlift) Squadron): 1 January 1967 – 1 March 1972 (C-7A Tail Code: KC; call sign Law)
 459th Troop Carrier Squadron (later 459th Tactical Airlift Squadron): 1 January 1967 – 1 March 1972 (C-7A Tail Code: KE; call sign Ellis)
 Stationed at Phu Cat Air Base, Viet Nam
 535th Troop Carrier Squadron (later 535th Tactical Airlift Squadron): 1 January 1967 – 24 January 1972 (C-7A Tail Code: KH; call sign Tong) (detached to Tactical Group, Provisional, 6483rd, 15 March 1969 – 30 June 1970)
 Stationed at Vung Tau Airfield 1 January 1967 – 21 June 1970
 536th Troop Carrier (later Tactical Airlift) Squadron: 1 January 1967 – 15 October 1971  (C-7A Tail Code: KL; call sign Iris) (detached to Tactical Group, Provisional, 6483rd, 15 March 1969 – 30 June 1970)
 Stationed at Vung Tau Airfield 1 January 1967 – ca 1 July 1970
 537th Troop Carrier (later Tactical Airlift) Squadron: 1 January 1967 – 31 August 1971(C-7A Tail Code: KN; Soul)
 Stationed at Phu Cat Air Base, Viet Nam
 Royal Australian Air Force, Transport Flight Vietnam / 35 Squadron (DHC-4 call sign: Wallaby) Jul 1964 – Feb 1972
 Stationed at Vung Tau Airfield, Viet Nam

Support Units
 6466th USAF Hospital: ca. 1 July 1954 – 25 June 1960
 483rd Avionics Maintenance Squadron (later 483rd Consolidated Aircraft Maintenance Squadron, 483rd Field Maintenance Squadron): 8 March 1958 – 25 June 1960, 15 Jul 71 – 30 April 1972
 483rd Field Maintenance Squadron (later 483rd Consolidated Aircraft Maintenance Squadron, 483rd Field Maintenance Squadron): 8 March 1958 – 25 June 1960, 1 January 1967 – 13 May 1972
 483rd Flight Line Maintenance Squadron: 8 March 1958 – 18 December 1959
 483rd Periodic Maintenance Squadron (later 483rd Organizational Maintenance Squadron): 8 March 1958 – 25 June 1960, 10 December 1970 – 30 April 1972
 483rd Munitions Maintenance Squadron, 15 July 1971 – 30 April 1972
 6483rd Flight Line Maintenance Squadron: 22 August 1957 – 8 March 1958
 6483rd Periodic Maintenance Squadron: 22 August 1957 – 8 March 1958

Stations
 Ashiya AB, Japan, 1 January 1953 – 25 June 1960.
 Cam Ranh Bay AB, South Vietnam, 15 October 1966 – 31 May 1972.

Aircraft flown

 A-37B, 1971–1972
 C-7A, 1967–1972
 C-47D, 1953–1959

 VC-47D 1970–1971
 EC-47N 1971–1972)
 EC-47P 1971–1972)

 EC-47Q 1971–1972)
 C-119A, 1953–1955
 C-119B, 1953–1955

 C-119G, 1955–1959
 C-130A, 1958–1960
 UH-1, 1971–1972.

Awards
The temporary bestowal of the honors of the 483rd Bombardment Group entitles the wing to display the two Distinguished Unit Citations earned by the group as appropriate in addition to these awards.
 
 Presidential Unit Citation
 Southeast Asia 21 January 1968 – 12 May 1968
 Southeast Asia 1 April 1970 – 30 June 1970

 
 Air Force Outstanding Unit Award with "V" Device
 1 January 1967 – 30 April 1967
 1 May 1967 –  30 April 1968
 1 July 1970 – 31 December 1971

 
 Air Force Outstanding Unit Award
 6 May 1953 – 10 September 1954

 
 Korean Presidential Unit Citation
 1 January 1953 – 27 July 1953

 
 Republic of Viet Nam Gallantry Cross
 15 October 1966 – 31 March 1968
 1 August 1967 – 30 October 1971
 1 May 1967 – 31 May 1972

 
 Korean Service Medal
 Campaigns
 Third Korean Winter
 Korea Summer-Fall 1953

 
 Viet Nam Service Medal
 Campaigns

 Vietnam Air Offensive
 Vietnam Air Offensive, Phase II
 Vietnam Air Offensive, Phase III
 Vietnam Air/Ground
 Vietnam Air Offensive, Phase IV

 TET69/Counteroffensive
 Vietnam Summer-Fall 1969
 Vietnam Winter-Spring 1970
 Sanctuary Counteroffensive
 Southwest Monsoon

 Commando Hunt V
 Commando Hunt VI
 Commando Hunt VII
 Vietnam Ceasefire

References

Notes

Bibliography

 
 
 
 

Further Reading
 
 
Part 1 Part 2 Part 3 Part 4

External links
 USAAS-USAAC-USAAF-USAF Aircraft Serial Numbers—1908 to present

0483